The following outline is provided as an overview of and topical guide to Panama:

Panama – sovereign country located on the Isthmus of Panama in Central America.  Some geographers categorize Panama as a transcontinental nation connecting the northern and southern portions of the Americas. Panama borders Costa Rica to the north-west, Colombia to the south-east, the Caribbean Sea to the north and the North Pacific Ocean to the south. It is an international business center and host to important ports, for the volume of traffic, in the Pacific and Caribbean side. Although Panama is the 3rd largest economy in Central America, after Guatemala and Costa Rica, it has the largest expenditure on resource consumption, making the country the largest consumer in Central America.

General reference 

 Pronunciation:
 Common English country name:  Panama
 Official English country name:  The Republic of Panama
 Common endonym(s):  
 Official endonym(s):  
 Adjectival(s): Panamanian
 Demonym(s):
 Etymology: Name of Panama
 International rankings of Panama
 ISO country codes:  PA, PAN, 591
 ISO region codes:  See ISO 3166-2:PA
 Internet country code top-level domain:  .pa

Geography of Panama 

Geography of Panama
 Panama is: a country
 Location:
 Northern Hemisphere and Western Hemisphere
 Americas
 North America
 Middle America
 Central America
 Time zone:  Eastern Standard Time (UTC-05)
 Extreme points of Panama
 High:  Volcán Barú 
 Low:  North Pacific Ocean and Caribbean Sea 0 m
 Land boundaries:  555 km
 330 km
 225 km
 Coastline:  2,490 km
 Population of Panama: 3,343,000  - 131st most populous country

 Area of Panama: 75,517 km2
 Atlas of Panama

Environment of Panama 

 Climate of Panama
 Renewable energy in Panama
 Geology of Panama
 Protected areas of Panama
 Biosphere reserves in Panama
 National parks of Panama
 Wildlife of Panama
 Fauna of Panama
 Birds of Panama
 Mammals of Panama
 Monkey species of Panama

Natural geographic features of Panama 

 Fjords of Panama
 Glaciers of Panama
 Islands of Panama
 Lakes of Panama
 Mountains of Panama
 Volcanoes in Panama
 Rivers of Panama
 Waterfalls of Panama
 Valleys of Panama
 World Heritage Sites in Panama

Regions of Panama 

Regions of Panama

Ecoregions of Panama 

List of ecoregions in Panama
 Ecoregions in Panama

Administrative divisions of Panama 

Administrative divisions of Panama
 Provinces of Panama
 Districts of Panama
 Municipalities of Panama

Provinces of Panama 

Provinces of Panama

Districts of Panama 

Districts of Panama

Municipalities of Panama 

Municipalities of Panama
 	
 Capital of Panama: Panama City
 Cities of Panama

Demography of Panama 

Demographics of Panama

Government and politics of Panama 

Politics of Panama
 Form of government:
 Capital of Panama: Panama City
 Elections in Panama
 Political parties in Panama

Branches of the government of Panama 

Government of Panama

Executive branch of the government of Panama 
 Head of state: President of Panama, Ricardo Martinelli
 Cabinet of Panama

Legislative branch of the government of Panama 
 National Assembly (unicameral)

Judicial branch of the government of Panama 

Court system of Panama
 Supreme Court of Panama

Foreign relations of Panama 

Foreign relations of Panama
 Diplomatic missions in Panama
 Diplomatic missions of Panama

International organization membership 
The Republic of Panama is a member of:

Agency for the Prohibition of Nuclear Weapons in Latin America and the Caribbean (OPANAL)
Andean Community of Nations (CAN) (observer)
Central American Bank for Economic Integration (BCIE)
Central American Integration System (SICA)
Food and Agriculture Organization (FAO)
Group of 77 (G77)
Inter-American Development Bank (IADB)
International Atomic Energy Agency (IAEA)
International Bank for Reconstruction and Development (IBRD)
International Chamber of Commerce (ICC)
International Civil Aviation Organization (ICAO)
International Criminal Court (ICCt)
International Criminal Police Organization (Interpol)
International Development Association (IDA)
International Federation of Red Cross and Red Crescent Societies (IFRCS)
International Finance Corporation (IFC)
International Fund for Agricultural Development (IFAD)
International Labour Organization (ILO)
International Maritime Organization (IMO)
International Mobile Satellite Organization (IMSO)
International Monetary Fund (IMF)
International Olympic Committee (IOC)
International Organization for Migration (IOM)
International Organization for Standardization (ISO)
International Red Cross and Red Crescent Movement (ICRM)
International Telecommunication Union (ITU)
International Telecommunications Satellite Organization (ITSO)

International Trade Union Confederation (ITUC)
Inter-Parliamentary Union (IPU)
Latin American Economic System (LAES)
Latin American Integration Association (LAIA) (observer)
Multilateral Investment Guarantee Agency (MIGA)
Nonaligned Movement (NAM)
Organisation for the Prohibition of Chemical Weapons (OPCW)
Organization of American States (OAS)
Permanent Court of Arbitration (PCA)
Rio Group (RG)
South American Community of Nations (CSN) (observer)
Unión Latina
United Nations (UN)
Union of South American Nations (UNASUR) (observer)
United Nations Conference on Trade and Development (UNCTAD)
United Nations Educational, Scientific, and Cultural Organization (UNESCO)
United Nations Industrial Development Organization (UNIDO)
Universal Postal Union (UPU)
World Confederation of Labour (WCL)
World Customs Organization (WCO)
World Federation of Trade Unions (WFTU)
World Health Organization (WHO)
World Intellectual Property Organization (WIPO)
World Meteorological Organization (WMO)
World Tourism Organization (UNWTO)
World Trade Organization (WTO)

Law and order in Panama 

Law of Panama
 Constitution of Panama
 Crime in Panama
 Human rights in Panama
 LGBT rights in Panama
 Freedom of religion in Panama
 Law enforcement in Panama

Military of Panama 

Military of Panama
 Command
 Commander-in-chief:
 Ministry of Defence of Panama
 Forces
 Army of Panama
 Navy of Panama
 Air Force of Panama
 Special forces of Panama
 Military history of Panama
 Military ranks of Panama

Local government in Panama 

Local government in Panama

History of Panama 

History of Panama
Timeline of the history of Panama
Current events of Panama
 Military history of Panama

Culture of Panama 

Culture of Panama
 Architecture of Panama
 Cuisine of Panama
 Festivals in Panama
 Languages of Panama
 Media in Panama
 National symbols of Panama
 Coat of arms of Panama
 Flag of Panama
 National anthem of Panama
 People of Panama
 Prostitution in Panama
 Public holidays in Panama
 Records of Panama
 Religion in Panama
 Buddhism in Panama
 Christianity in Panama
 Hinduism in Panama
 Islam in Panama
 Judaism in Panama
 Sikhism in Panama
 World Heritage Sites in Panama
 TransPanama Trail

Art in Panama 
 Literature of Panama
 Music of Panama

Sports in Panama 

Sports in Panama
 Football in Panama
 Panama at the Olympics

Economy and infrastructure of Panama 

Economy of Panama
 Economic rank, by nominal GDP (2007): 95th (ninety-fifth)
 Agriculture in Panama
 Banking in Panama
 National Bank of Panama
 Communications in Panama
 Internet in Panama
 Companies of Panama
Currency of Panama: Balboa/Dollar
ISO 4217: PAB/USD
 Health care in Panama
 Panama Stock Exchange
 Transport in Panama
 Airports in Panama
 Rail transport in Panama
 Tourism in Panama
 Water supply and sanitation in Panama

Education in Panama 

Education in Panama

See also 

Panama
Index of Panama-related articles
List of international rankings
List of Panama-related topics
Member state of the United Nations
Outline of Central America
Outline of geography
Outline of North America

References

External links 

 Government and Diplomacy

  The President of Panama
  List of Panamanian Government Agencies 
  Ministry of External Relations
 Embassy of Panama in the U.S.
 National Directorate of Immigration and Naturalization

 Tourism and Travel
 Official Site of the Panama Tourism Bureau
 Photos Of Panama 
 Official Site of the Panama Canal Authority

 Economy and Business
  Ministry of Economics and Finance
  Bolsa de Valores (Panama Stock Exchange)
  Comisión Nacional de Valores (Panama SEC)
 American Chamber of Commerce & Industry of Panama

 Nature conservation
  reforestation for the endemic Squirrel Monkey

 Media and Discussion
  La Prensa
  Mi Diario

 1
Panama